Cobalt chelatase is an enzyme that catalyzes the chemical reaction

ATP + hydrogenobyrinic acid a,c-diamide + Co2+ + H2O  ADP + phosphate + cob(II)yrinic acid a,c-diamide + H+

The four substrates of this enzyme are ATP, hydrogenobyrinic acid a,c-diamide, Co2+, and H2O; its four products are ADP, phosphate, cob(II)yrinic acid a,c-diamide, and H+.

The aerobic cobalt chelatase (aerobic cobalamin biosynthesis pathway) consists of three subunits, CobT, CobN and CobS.

The macrocycle of vitamin B12 can be complexed with metal via the ATP-dependent reactions in the aerobic pathway (e.g., in Pseudomonas denitrificans) or via ATP-independent reactions of sirohydrochlorin in the anaerobic pathway (e.g., in Salmonella typhimurium). The corresponding cobalt chelatases are not homologous. However, aerobic cobalt chelatase subunits CobN and CobS are homologous to Mg-chelatase subunits BchH and BchI, respectively. CobT, too, has been found to be remotely related to the third subunit of Mg-chelatase, BchD (involved in bacteriochlorophyll synthesis, e.g., in Rhodobacter capsulatus).

This enzyme belongs to the family of ligases, specifically those forming nitrogen-D-metal bonds in coordination complexes.  The systematic name of this enzyme class is hydrogenobyrinic-acid-a,c-diamide:cobalt cobalt-ligase (ADP-forming). Other names in common use include hydrogenobyrinic acid a,c-diamide cobaltochelatase, CobNST, and CobNCobST. This enzyme is part of the biosynthetic pathway to cobalamin (vitamin B12) in aerobic bacteria.

See also
 Cobalamin biosynthesis

References

Further reading 

 
 

EC 6.6.1